"You Don't Treat Me No Good" is a song by American soul group Sonia Dada. Released in 1992 as the group's debut single outside the United States, the song reached number two in New Zealand and became an unexpected number-one hit in Australia, spending four weeks atop the ARIA Singles Chart and ending 1993 as the nation's third-best-selling hit. Eighteen years later, country music singer Jerrod Niemann released a cover version under the title "Lover, Lover", and his version reached number one on the US Hot Country Songs chart.

History
Glenn A. Baker of Billboard magazine described the song's chart success as "the most unexpected and honestly 
surprising breakout in the Australian market for many years." He also cited the song as an example of the label's success with breaking new acts outside their home markets. X102 and SAFM in Adelaide were among the first stations to play the song, and it rapidly spread to other stations owned by Austereo Network. In the United States, the single was released in January 1993; seven years later, in March 2000, it was re-serviced to hot and modern adult contemporary radio under the title "(Lover) You Don't Treat Me No Good".

Critical reception
Joe Rassenfoss of the Rocky Mountain News, in his review of the album, called the song a "catchy vocal entreaty."

Chart performance
"You Don't Treat Me No Good" debuted at number 38 on the Australian ARIA Charts on November 29, 1992. After spending six weeks at the number-two position behind Whitney Houston's version of "I Will Always Love You", the song reached its peak of number one on February 28, 1993. It held that position for four weeks, then fell to number four on March 28. It was ranked number three on the ARIA year-end chart. In neighboring New Zealand, the song debuted at number 47 on November 29, 1992, then reached its peak of number two on January 17, unable to dethrone "I Will Always Love You" from the top spot for five weeks. It remained in the top 40 for 11 more weeks and ended the year as New Zealand's 27th-best-selling single. Although the song did not chart in the United States, the self-titled album from which it was taken sold more than 100,000 copies after its 1992 release.

Track listings
US cassette single
 "You Don't Treat Me No Good" – 4:08
 "You Don't Treat Me No Good" (Ebersold/Paige remix) – 3:25

Australian and New Zealand CD and cassette single
 "You Don't Treat Me No Good"
 "Deliver Me (Slight Return)"

Charts

Weekly charts

Year-end charts

Certifications

Release history

Jerrod Niemann version

On March 1, 2010, American country music artist Jerrod Niemann released a cover version of this song under the title "Lover, Lover". It was Niemann's first release on the Sea Gayle label, a sister label of Arista Nashville, as well as his fourth single release overall. It is included on his album Judge Jerrod & the Hung Jury, which was released in July 2010.

History
Niemann's recording of the song features nine vocal tracks, all of which he recorded himself and then overdubbed. He recorded eight of the vocal tracks in one day and recorded the bass backing vocals the next day. Niemann once explained that his voice was hoarse from recording the eight vocal parts and was unable to record the bass vocal. He and a friend then visited the Nashville tavern Tin Roof, which is near the studio where the song was recorded, after Niemann recalled upon several occasions where the Tin Roof bartender would serve Niemann excessive doses of whiskey resulting in Niemann awakening in the morning after with an extremely low voice. Thus Niemann "medicated" his vocal cords by having the Tin Roof bartender serve him Jack Daniels whiskey nonstop for approximately six hours that night, returning to the studio the next morning to record the bass vocal.

Content

The song is in the key of G Major, at a moderate tempo, based around a two-measure riff played on acoustic guitar. No full chords are played in the song, although the second measure of the riff includes an open fifth consisting of C and G.

Critical reception
Writing for the CMT blog, Whitney Self said that Niemann "gives the tune a new feel with his contagious beats and acoustic guitar." Bobby Peacock of Roughstock called it "soulful, catchy and distinctive," giving it a four-star rating out of five.

Music video
Potsy Ponciroli directed the music video, which features Niemann playing guitar while singing the song on a porch. It was filmed in Nashville, Tennessee. Jamey Johnson and Randy Houser make cameos at the end.

Chart performance
"Lover, Lover" debuted at number 52 on the Billboard Hot Country Songs chart for the week ending March 6, 2010. On the week of August 14, 2010, it became his first number one. It peaked at number 29 on the Billboard Hot 100 and at number 100 on its year-end chart; it was number 22 on the Hot Country Songs year-end chart.

Weekly charts

Year-end charts

References

1992 debut singles
1992 songs
2010 singles
Arista Nashville singles
Festival Records singles
Jerrod Niemann songs
Number-one singles in Australia
Sonia Dada songs